The 2021 Rink Hockey European Championship (originally scheduled to be held in 2020, at La Roche-sur-Yon, and named EuroRink 2020), was the 54th edition of the Rink Hockey European Championship, a biennial tournament for men's national roller hockey teams of Europe organised by World Skate Europe – Rink Hockey. It took place between 15 and 20 November in Paredes, Portugal.

Spain were the defending champions and successfully defended their title, defeating France 2−1 (after extra time) in the final to claim their second consecutive title and eighteenth overall.

Teams
While ten teams were set to play in the 2020 tournament, the final field of participants was reduced to six. Austria, Belgium, England and Switzerland withdrew from the competition.

Venue
Originally scheduled to take place at Le Vendéspace, all the tournament matches will instead be played at Pavilhão Multiusos de Paredes, in Paredes, Portugal.

Group stage

Finals

Fifth place match

Third place match

Final

Final ranking

References

External links
 Official website

International roller hockey competitions hosted by Spain
2020 in Spanish sport
CERH European Roller Hockey Championship
2020 in roller hockey